In fluid dynamics, Berman flow is a steady flow created inside a rectangular channel with two equally porous walls. The concept is named after a scientist Abraham S. Berman who formulated the problem in 1953.

Flow description
Consider a rectangular channel of width much longer than the height. Let the distance between the top and bottom wall be  and choose the coordinates such that  lies in the midway between the two walls, with  points perpendicular to the planes. Let both walls be porous with equal velocity . Then the continuity equation and Navier–Stokes equations for incompressible fluid become

with boundary conditions

The boundary conditions at the center is due to symmetry. Therefore, Berman introduced the following form,

This constant will be eliminated out of the problem and will have no influence on the solution. Substituting this into the momentum equation leads to 

where  is the Reynolds number. Integrating once, we get

with boundary conditions

This third order nonlinear ordinary differential equation requires three boundary condition and the fourth boundary condition is to determine the constant . and this equation is found to possess multiple solutions. The figure shows the numerical solution for low Reynolds number, solving the equation for large Reynolds number is not a trivial computation.

Limiting solutions
In the limit , the solution can be written as

In the limit , the leading-order solution is given by

The above solution satisfies all the necessary boundary conditions even though Reynolds number is infinite (see also Taylor–Culick flow)

Axisymmetric case
The corresponding problem in porous pipe flows was addressed by S. W. Yuan and A. Finkelstein in 1955.

See also
Taylor–Culick flow

References

Flow regimes
Fluid dynamics